The 2000 Fall Brawl was the eighth and final Fall Brawl professional wrestling pay-per-view (PPV) event produced by World Championship Wrestling (WCW). The event took place on September 17, 2000 from the HSBC Arena in Buffalo, New York. It would be the final Fall Brawl event before the company folded and was purchased by rival promotion World Wrestling Federation (WWF) in March 2001.

Storylines
The event featured wrestlers from pre-existing scripted feuds and storylines. Wrestlers portrayed villains, heroes, or less distinguishable characters in the scripted events that built tension and culminated in a wrestling match or series of matches.

Event

The main event was a Caged Heat match, in which Kevin Nash defended the title against Booker T. Booker defeated Nash to win the title. Notable matches on the undercard were Scott Steiner versus Goldberg in a no disqualification match, Mike Awesome versus Jeff Jarrett in a Bunkhouse Brawl and Sting versus The Great Muta and Vampiro in a Triangle match and a ten-person elimination match between Filthy Animals and Natural Born Thrillers, which was stopped when Animals' teammate Paul Orndorff was injured during the match. The next night on Nitro, the elimination match was resumed with the remaining competitors, Rey Misterio, Jr. and Tygress of The Filthy Animals and Mike Sanders, Chuck Palumbo, Sean O'Haire, Mark Jindrak and Shawn Stasiak of The Natural Born Thrillers in which the Filthy Animals won by pinfall after Tygress hit a facebuster on Mike Sanders.

Reception
In 2019, Thomas Hall of Wrestling Rumors gave the event a rating of C-, stating, "Overall, this is the best pay per view they’ve done in a long time because they’re getting closer to having a balance between the insanity and an actual show. The show is still far from actually good, but at least they’re not making me spend an hour going on about how horrible the show was or how it broke the rules of wrestling. Somehow, that’s a major step forward for them, which is really sad to think about."

Results

Filthy Animals vs. Natural Born Thrillers eliminations

Aftermath
Scott Steiner's high-profile win over Goldberg at Fall Brawl catapulted him into main event status and he became a top contender for the WCW World Heavyweight Championship. Steiner faced the champion Booker T for the title at the following month's pay-per-view Halloween Havoc, where he lost by disqualification.

References

Fall Brawl
Events in Buffalo, New York
2000 in New York (state)
Professional wrestling in Buffalo, New York
September 2000 events in the United States
2000 World Championship Wrestling pay-per-view events